Andrew Warren Katzenmoyer (born December 2, 1977) is a former football player who was a linebacker. He was selected in the first round (28th overall) of the 1999 NFL draft by the New England Patriots. He played college football for Ohio State, and became the first Buckeye to win the Butkus Award. His playing career was shortened due to a neck injury.

Early years
Katzenmoyer was born in Kettering, Ohio. He and his family moved to Westerville, Ohio when he was 5. He attended Westerville South High School, and played high school football for the Westerville South Wildcats. Katzenmoyer won the Mr. Football Award and was selected as the national defensive player of the year his final year of high school.

College career
Katzenmoyer attended Ohio State University, where he played for the Ohio State Buckeyes football team from 1996 to 1998.  In the first game of his college career, he became the first true freshman to ever start at linebacker for the Buckeyes. As a freshman  he recorded 12 sacks including three in the 1997 Rose Bowl. As a sophomore in 1997, he was recognized as a consensus first-team All-American, and won the Dick Butkus Award and Jack Lambert Trophy. Katzenmoyer was a three time first-team all-Big Ten selection. He started 37 consecutive games and finished his college career with 256 tackles, 50 tackles-for-loss, 18 sacks and six Interceptions. In 2009, he was inducted into the Ohio State Athletics Hall Of Fame. Notably, he was the last player at Ohio State to wear number 45.

Professional career
The New England Patriots selected Katzenmoyer in the first round (28th pick overall) of the 1999 NFL Draft.  He suffered a neck injury during his first season with the Patriots that eventually forced him to have surgery and miss half of the 2000 season.  During training camp in 2001, Katzenmoyer walked out citing concern about a feeling in his neck.  He was placed on injured reserve for the remainder of the season.  The Patriots released Katzenmoyer before the beginning of the  season.

Life after football
Katzenmoyer is now selling property and casualty insurance and is the President of the NFL Alumni of Central Ohio.

References

External links
 

1977 births
Living people
All-American college football players
American football linebackers
New England Patriots players
Ohio State Buckeyes football players
Players of American football from Ohio